John Jacob "Johnny" Astor VIII, 3rd Baron Astor of Hever,  (born 16 June 1946), is an English businessman and politician from the Astor family. He sat in the House of Lords as an Conservative hereditary peer from 1986 to his retirement in 2022. Astor was Parliamentary Under-Secretary of State at the Ministry of Defence from 2010–2015. Astor is a Deputy Lieutenant of Kent.

Family background
Astor was born 16 June 1946. He is the eldest of the five children of Gavin Astor, 2nd Baron Astor of Hever, and Lady Irene Haig. Astor succeeded to the peerage after his father died from cancer in June 1984. His younger siblings are Bridget, Elizabeth, Sarah, and Philip.

Education and military career
Astor was educated at Eton College before serving with the Life Guards (the senior regiment of the British Army, part of the Household Cavalry) from 1966 until 1970, where he visited Malaysia, Hong Kong, and Northern Ireland as well as ceremonial duties in London.

He worked in France for 11 years, and is now patron of the Conservatives in Paris.

Political career
In 1994, Lord Astor was a British Parliamentary Observer in Johannesburg during the South African General Election. He was a member of the Executive, Association of Conservative Peers from 1996–1998. In 1999 he was elected to continue as a member of the House of Lords. Astor retired from the House of Lords on 22 July 2022.

From 1998–2001, he served as an Opposition Spokesman on Social Security and Health from 1998–2003. From 2001, he has been an Opposition Spokesman for Foreign & Commonwealth Affairs, and International Development, from 2003 to 2010, Opposition Spokesman for Defense, and from 2010 to 2011 a Lord in Waiting. From 2010–2015 he was parliamentary under-secretary of state at the Ministry of Defence. He is currently the Prime Minister's Trade Envoy to Oman and Defence Secretary's Adviser for Military Co-operation with the Sultanate of Oman.

He is former Hon. Vice-Chairman of the Conservative Middle East Council. In 1995 he piloted through the House of Lords the Road Traffic (New Drivers) Act and in 1996 the Trading Schemes Act.

Marriages and children
Astor married firstly Fiona Diana Lennox-Harvey on 1 July 1970.  They had three daughters together:

Camilla Fiona Astor (born 8 May 1974) she married Dominic M. Trusted and they have one daughter:
Raya Trusted (March 2008)
Tania Jentie Astor (born 18 April 1978)
Violet Magdalene Astor (born 1980)

They were divorced in 1990 and in the same year Astor married Elizabeth Mackintosh, younger daughter of John Mackintosh, 2nd Viscount Mackintosh of Halifax.  They had two children:

Charles Gavin John Astor (born 10 November 1990). In June 2017, he married Princess Eliane Marie Ghislain de Merode. Their daughter, Astrid, was born in Sept. 2020.
Olivia Alexandra Elizabeth Astor (born 21 August 1992)

See also
Astor family

References

Arms

External links
 
Lord Astor  on the Conservative Party's website
Honorary Member of the Lions Club Walldorf-Astoria (Germany)

1946 births
Living people
People educated at Eton College
British Life Guards officers
English people of American descent
English people of German descent
English people of Irish descent
English people of Scottish descent
Livingston family
John
Barons Astor of Hever
Conservative Party (UK) hereditary peers
Deputy Lieutenants of Kent
People from Westerham
English politicians
English businesspeople
Members of the Privy Council of the United Kingdom
Hereditary peers elected under the House of Lords Act 1999